Sean Phillips is a special effects artist. He was nominated at the 83rd Academy Awards in the category of Best Visual Effects, for the film Alice in Wonderland, along with Ken Ralston, David Schaub  and Carey Villegas.

Selected filmography
 Outbreak (1995)
 Stuart Little 2 (2002)
 Bad Boys II (2003)
 Alice in Wonderland (2010)

References

External links

Living people
Year of birth missing (living people)
Special effects people